Chaf Rural District is a rural district (dehestan) in the Central District of Langarud County, Gilan Province, Iran. At the 2006 census, its population (including Chaf and Chamkhaleh, which was subsequently detached from the rural district and promoted to city status) was 9,834, in 2,917 families; excluding Chaf and Chamkhaleh, the population (as of 2006) was 8,020, in 2,407 families. The rural district has 11 villages.

References 

Rural Districts of Gilan Province
Langarud County